Gerald Wheeler Bussell (born September 7, 1943) is a former American football defensive back who played in the American Football League (AFL) for the Denver Broncos. He played collegiately for the Georgia Tech football team.

References

1943 births
Living people
People from Middlesboro, Kentucky
Players of American football from Kentucky
American football defensive backs
Georgia Tech Yellow Jackets football players
Denver Broncos (AFL) players